Wojtkowski is a Polish surname. Notable people with the surname include:

Kamil Wojtkowski (born 1998), Polish footballer
Maciej Wojtkowski (born 1975), Polish physicist
Marek Wojtkowski (born 1968), Polish politician

See also
Wojakowski

Polish-language surnames